Tollaincourt is a commune in the Vosges department in Grand Est in northeastern France. On 1 January 2017, the former commune of Rocourt was merged into Tollaincourt.

See also
Communes of the Vosges department

References

Communes of Vosges (department)